Horace Thurston Berry (1891 – 1 September 1949) was an Australian politician who was an independent member of the Legislative Assembly of Western Australia from 1939 to 1947, representing the seat of Irwin-Moore.

Family 
Berry was born in Suva, Fiji, to Sarah Eugene (née Morey) and John Berry. His father, an Australian, had been posted to Fiji as the colony's Commissioner of Lands and Surveys. The family returned to Australia in 1900 and settled in Sydney, where Berry attended Sydney Grammar School and The King's School, Parramatta.

Military career 
He enlisted in the Australian Imperial Force in August 1915, and later joined the British Army's Royal Flying Corps, finishing the war with the rank of flying officer.

After the war 
In 1919, Berry went to Malaya, where he managed a rubber plantation in Kajang, Selangor. He returned to Australia in 1930, purchasing a property at Yerecoin (a locality in Western Australia's Wheatbelt region).

Political career 
Berry first attempted to enter politics at the 1934 Legislative Council elections, where he lost to Vernon Hamersley in East Province. In the late 1930s, he retired from farming to live in Rockingham (on the outskirts of Perth), and served a term on the Rockingham Road Board. Berry succeeded in entering parliament on his second attempt, defeating Country and Labor Party candidates to win the 1939 Irwin-Moore by-election as an independent. The by-election had been caused by the resignation of Claude Barker, who campaigned on Berry's behalf. Berry retained Irwin-Moore at the 1943 state election, but the seat was abolished prior the 1947 election. He instead contested the new seat of Moore, but was defeated by the Country Party's John Ackland. After leaving parliament, he was re-elected to the Rockingham Road Board, serving as chairman for a period. Berry died in Perth in September 1949.

References

1891 births
1949 deaths
Australian Army officers
Australian expatriates in Malaysia
Australian military personnel of World War I
Independent members of the Parliament of Western Australia
Mayors of places in Western Australia
Members of the Western Australian Legislative Assembly
People educated at Sydney Grammar School
People educated at The King's School, Parramatta
People from Suva
Royal Flying Corps officers
20th-century Australian politicians
Australian expatriates in Fiji
Western Australian local councillors